The 1920 Montana gubernatorial election took place on November 2, 1920. Incumbent Governor of Montana Sam V. Stewart, who was first elected Governor in 1912 and 1916, declined to run for re-election. To replace him, former United States Senator Joseph M. Dixon won the Republican primary, which was closely contested. In the general election, he faced Burton K. Wheeler, the former United States Attorney for the District of Montana and the Democratic nominee. Ultimately, Dixon defeated Wheeler by a wide margin to win his first and only term as governor.

Democratic primary

Candidates
Burton K. Wheeler, former United States Attorney for the District of Montana and State Representative
W. W. McDowell, Lieutenant Governor of Montana
Thomas E. Cary

Results

Republican primary

Candidates
Joseph M. Dixon, former United States Senator
Henry L. Wilson
Sam C. Ford, Attorney General of Montana
Robert Lee Clinton
Daniel W. Slayton, rancher
Ronald Higgins

Results

General election

Results

References

Montana
Gubernatorial
1920
November 1920 events in the United States